The Dupree-Ratliff House is a historic house in Raymond, Mississippi, U.S..

History
The house was built in 1853 for Dr. H.T.T. Dupree and his wife, Margaret Fairchild. It belonged to the Barksdale family in the 1960s, followed by the Thrashes in the 1980s.

Architectural significance
The house was designed in the Greek Revival and Italianate architectural styles. It has been listed on the National Register of Historic Places since July 15, 1986.

References

Houses on the National Register of Historic Places in Mississippi
Greek Revival architecture in Mississippi
Italianate architecture in Mississippi
Houses completed in 1853
Houses in Raymond, Mississippi